The Policy Planning Staff (sometimes referred to as the Policy Planning Council, the Office of Policy Planning or by its in-house acronym S/P) is the principal strategic arm of the United States Department of State. It was created in 1947 by Foreign Service Officer George F. Kennan at the request of Secretary of State George Marshall to serve "as a source of independent policy analysis and advice for the Secretary of State." Its first assignment was to design the Marshall Plan.

Early directors include George F. Kennan and Paul Nitze. More recently came Anne-Marie Slaughter, Jake Sullivan, Dennis Ross, Gregory B. Craig, Paul Wolfowitz, and Richard Haass. Past members include Zbigniew Brzezinski, Sandy Berger, Kori Schake, Michael Armacost, and Peter Berkowitz. At least 14 past members of the Policy Planning Staff have served as Ambassadors.

The Staff is headed by the Director of Policy Planning. The current head is Salman Ahmed.

See also
 Director of Policy Planning

References

External links
Official website

United States Department of State agencies
United States diplomacy
1947 establishments in the United States